Joann Anton Venuto, also styled as Jan Antonín Venuto, (24 May 1746 – 1 April 1833) was a Czech clergyman, watercolorist, draftsman, and cartographer. He specialized in the paintings of Bohemian and Moravian castles.

Biography
Venuto was born on 24 May 1746 in Jevišovice, in the Margraviate of Moravia (present-day Czech Republic). In 1769, he became a canon living with Bishop Jan Leopold Hay at the Cathedral of the Holy Spirit, Hradec Králové. He died on 1 April 1833.

Gallery

References

1746 births
1833 deaths
People from Jevišovice
People from the Margraviate of Moravia
Czech Roman Catholic priests
Czech painters